Bunour railway station is an abandoned railway station on the Pinkenba railway line on the boundary between the suburbs of Eagle Farm and Pinkenba in the City of Brisbane, Queensland, Australia. It opened in 1949 and closed on 27 September 1993.

The name is derived from the aboriginal name for the black and white Australian white ibis bird.

History
The line to Pinkenba opened on 1 April 1897, and Bunour railway station opened in 1949 for workers in the growing industrial area.

A large army camp defense storage and warehouse facility, used during World War II (1939 to 1945), is located beside the site of Bunour railway station and remains today as the Damascus Barracks.

In 1988 the Pinkenba line was electrified, however only as far as the prior Eagle Farm station; infrequent passenger services consisting of stainless steel carriages hauled by diesel locomotives operated through Bunour.  On 27 September 1993, all passenger services on the line were suspended as part of a rationalisation of the state rail network with the suspending or closing of unprofitable and under-utilised rail lines by the Goss Labor Party state government.

Current status
The original low-level platform is all that remains of Bunour railway station today.

Replacement bus service
The bus stop for the replacement TransLink bus service (303) is immediately beside Bunour station in Kingsford Smith Drive.

See also
Queensland Rail City network
TransLink (Queensland)

References

Disused railway stations in Brisbane
Railway stations in Australia opened in 1949
Railway stations closed in 1993
Pinkenba, Queensland
Eagle Farm, Queensland